The sixth season of Adventure Time, an American animated television series created by Pendleton Ward, premiered on Cartoon Network on April 21, 2014 and concluded on June 5, 2015, and was produced by Frederator Studios and Cartoon Network Studios. The season follows the adventures of Finn, a human boy, and his best friend and adoptive brother Jake, a dog with magical powers to change shape and size at will. Finn and Jake live in the post-apocalyptic Land of Ooo, where they interact with the other main characters of the show: Princess Bubblegum, The Ice King, Marceline the Vampire Queen, Lumpy Space Princess, BMO, and Flame Princess.

The season was storyboarded and written by Andy Ristaino, Cole Sanchez, Tom Herpich, Steve Wolfhard, Seo Kim, Somvilay Xayaphone, Graham Falk, Derek Ballard, Jesse Moynihan, Masaaki Yuasa, Adam Muto, Kent Osborne, Lyle Partridge, Bert Youn, Madeleine Flores, Jillian Tamaki, Sam Alden, Sloane Leong, Brandon Graham, and David Ferguson. The season also featured Yuasa and Ferguson as guest animators for the episodes "Food Chain" and "Water Park Prank", respectively. This season was the last to feature Sanchez and Ristaino as storyboard artists; the former took a directing job on the mini-series Long Live the Royals (although he eventually returned to the series as a supervising director for its eighth season), and the latter became an Adventure Time background designer.

The season premiered with two episodes, "Wake Up" and "Escape from the Citadel", which together were viewed by 3.32 million viewers. This marked a significant increase in ratings from the previous season finale. The season concluded with the two-part finale "Hot Diggity Doom" and "The Comet", which was viewed by 1.55 million viewers. Beginning with this season, Adventure Time moved from its long-held Monday timeslot, with many episodes instead airing on Thursdays. A number of sixth-season episodes also aired internationally before they were broadcast domestically. The season was met with largely positive critical reception. The episode "Food Chain" was nominated for several Annie Awards, as well as an Annecy International Animated Film Festival Award. The episode "Jake the Brick" won a Primetime Emmy Award for Short-format Animation at the 67th Primetime Emmy Awards, and Tom Herpich won an Emmy for his work on "Walnuts & Rain". Furthermore, "The Diary" and "Walnuts and Rain" were nominated for Annie Awards, and the show itself won a Peabody Award. In addition, several compilation DVDs that contain episodes from the season have been released. The full season was released on DVD and Blu-ray on October 11, 2016.

Development

Concept
The season follows the adventures of Finn the Human, a human boy, and his best friend Jake, a dog with magical powers to change shape, grow, and shrink at will. Finn and Jake live in the post-apocalyptic Land of Ooo, wherein they interact with the other major characters, including: Princess Bubblegum, The Ice King, Marceline the Vampire Queen, Lumpy Space Princess, BMO, and Flame Princess. Common storylines revolve around Finn and Jake discovering strange creatures, dealing with the antagonistic but misunderstood Ice King, and battling monsters in order to help others. This season's main story arc, however, deals with Finn discovering the true identity of his human father, and his subsequent attempts to reconnect with him. The season ends with Princess Bubblegum being deposed by the King of Ooo (voiced by Andy Daly), and Finn fighting the primordial cosmic space demon Orgalorg (the actual identity of Gunter the penguin).

Production

On January 28, 2013, during the middle of the show's fifth season, Cartoon Network officially announced that the show had been renewed for a sixth season. In July 2013, storyboard artist Jesse Moynihan revealed that production for the sixth season had begun. This season's episodes were produced in a process similar to those of the previous seasons' episodes. Each episode was outlined in two-to-three pages that contained the necessary plot information. These outlines were then handed to storyboard artists, who created full storyboards. Design and coloring were done at Cartoon Network Studios in Burbank, California, and animation was handled overseas in South Korea by Rough Draft Korea and Saerom Animation. While almost all of the animation for the show is done through these studios, two episodes were written and animated entirely by guest animators. The first, "Food Chain", was helmed by noted Japanese animator Masaaki Yuasa, and was entirely animated by Yuasa's own studio. The second, "Water Park Prank", was directed by David Ferguson.

The season was storyboarded and written by Andy Ristaino, Cole Sanchez, Tom Herpich, Steve Wolfhard, Seo Kim, Somvilay Xayaphone, Graham Falk, Derek Ballard, Moynihan, Yuasa, Adam Muto, Kent Osborne, Lyle Partridge, Bert Youn, Madeleine Flores, Jillian Tamaki, Sam Alden, Sloane Leong, Brandon Graham, and David Ferguson. "The Prince Who Wanted Everything" marked the return of Youn—a storyboarder during the show's first, third, and fourth seasons—to the series. He had left after the first season for mandatory military service in his native South Korea, and returned during the third season. He once again left the series after the conclusion of its fourth season to focus his attention on Studio Spiyo in Seoul, South Korea. However, Youn returned to work on "The Prince Who Wanted Everything", although it was a "one-off gig", and he subsequently took a job working on Over the Garden Wall. The sixth season of Adventure Time also marked the final season that both Andy Ristaino and Cole Sanchez worked as storyboard artists. Ristaino revealed in a podcast that, once the season was finished, he was "burnt out". He did, however, return as a background designer for the seventh season. Sanchez, on the other hand, left the series to become a supervising director on Long Live the Royals. He eventually returned to the series as a supervising director for its eighth season.

This was the last season of Adventure Time to feature Nick Jennings as the series' art director; he had originally been brought on at the start of the first season at the behest of Cartoon Network, and had served as the sole art director for five and a half seasons. Following the show's sixth season, he left to work on the 2016 reboot of the Powerpuff Girls. He was replaced by Sandra Lee—also known as Sandra Calleros—who had previously been the series' background paint supervisor. Both Jennings and Lee were credited as art co-directors starting with the thirty-third episode, "Jermaine".

Cast

The voice actors for the season include: Jeremy Shada (Finn the Human), John DiMaggio (Jake the Dog), Tom Kenny (The Ice King), Hynden Walch (Princess Bubblegum), and Olivia Olson (Marceline the Vampire Queen). Ward himself provides the voice for several minor characters, including Lumpy Space Princess. Former storyboard artist Niki Yang voices the sentient video game console BMO in English, as well as Jake's girlfriend Lady Rainicorn in Korean. Polly Lou Livingston, a friend of Pendleton Ward's mother, Bettie Ward, plays the voice of the small elephant Tree Trunks. Justin Roiland provides the voice of the Earl of Lemongrab. Jessica DiCicco voices Flame Princess, Finn's former romantic interest. Several episodes also feature The Lich, the series' principal antagonist. The Lich is portrayed by Ron Perlman in his demonic form, and by Ethan Maher as a large baby after the events of the season premiere. Finn's father, Martin, first introduced in "Escape from the Citadel", is voiced by Stephen Root. The Adventure Time cast records their lines together as opposed to doing it individually. This is to capture more natural sounding dialogue among the characters. Hynden Walch has described these group session as akin to "doing a play reading—a really, really out there play."

In addition to the regular cast members, episodes feature guest voices from many ranges of professions, including actors, musicians, and artists. The season openers, "Wake Up" and "Escape from the Citadel", feature the return of Kumail Nanjiani as Prismo, M. Emmet Walsh as the Cosmic Owl, and Miguel Ferrer as Death and one of the heads of Grob Gob Glob Grod. Nanjiani would return again in the episodes "Is That You?" and "Hoots";  Walsh would reappear in "Hoots". "James II" features Andy Merrill reprising his role as James. The A.V. Club columnist Cameron Esposito lends her voice to Carroll the cloud woman. "Sad Face" features both Andy Milonakis reprising his role as the Never-Ending Pie Throwing Robot (N.E.P.T.R.)., and Brett Gelman as the bug ringleader. Milonakis would also return in "Furniture & Meat". Comedian Melinda Hill reprises her role as Doctor Princess in the episode "Breezy", which also features the vocal talents of Ashly Burch as the titular character. Burch would also voice a blacksmith in "Little Brother", and the Super Porp spokesperson Cheryl in "Dark Purple". Regular Show writer and voice actor Minty Lewis voices Erin the caterpillar in "Food Chain". "The Prince Who Wanted Everything" features both Madeleine Martin as Fionna and Roz Ryan as Cake, as well as Peter Serafinowicz, who voices Lumpy Space Prince, the gender-switched version of Lumpy Space Princess. Prolific voice actor Alan Oppenheimer also voices Darren and the Sun in "Something Big", and actress Jill Talley also reprises her role as Maja. "Something Big" also sees the return of Keith Ferguson as Colonel Candy Corn; he would also reprise this role in several other season six episodes. James Urbaniak plays both Leafbeard and the Rat King in "Little Brother", and Thurop Van Orman, a former supervising producer and writer for the series during its second season, also appears in the aforementioned episode, playing the part of Kent. Kristen Schaal and Dan Mintz reprise their roles as Jake Jr. and T.V., respectively, in "Ocarina", and the episode also sees the introduction of Marc Evan Jackson and Paget Brewster as Kim Kil Whan and Viola, respectively. Duncan Trussell, Steve Little, Dana Snyder, and series storyboard artist Cole Sanchez, return in "Thanks for the Crabapples, Giuseppe!", playing the roles of Ron James, Abracadaniel, the Ancient Sleeping Magi of Life Giving, and Little Dude, respectively.

Grey DeLisle returns to voice Breakfast Princess in "Princess Day". Rainn Wilson reprises his role as Rattleballs in "Nemesis", and also voices the new character Peace Master. Billy West voices Goose, Dr. Erik Adamkinson, and the Mayor in "Everything's Jake", and Tress MacNeille appears in the same episode, playing the part of Dr. Erik Adamkinson's father. In "Dentist", Collin Dean reprises his role as Tiffany, Lucy Lawless guest stars as the Queen of the Ants, and Andy Daly plays Lieutenant Gamergate. Daly also reprises his role as the King of Ooo in "Gold Stars" and the first part of the season finale, "Hot Diggity Doom". Brody Stevens voices a character in "The Cooler". "Evergreen" guest stars Pamela Adlon, Alan Tudyk, and Keith David as Gunter, Chatsberry, and Balthus, respectively. "Gold Stars" sees the introduction of Paul Scheer as Toronto, a character who would also appear in "Hot Diggity Doom". "The Mountain" features prolific voice actor Jim Cummings as Matthew. Jackie Buscarino returns as Susan Strong in "Dark Purple". In "The Diary", Dan Mintz voices T.V., Alia Shawkat voices the younger version of Nurse Poundcake, and Clark Duke plays both Justin Rockcandy and Jawbreaker guy. "Walnuts & Rain" sees the introduction of the bear Seven, voiced by Chris Isaak. The episode also features Matt L. Jones, an actor who first appeared in the first season episode "Memories of Boom Boom Mountain" voicing the crying Mountain, lending his voice to King Huge. "Friends Forever" guest stars Tipper Newton as Lamp and Brent Weinbach as Bass Drum. Newton would later reappear in "On the Lam", voicing the alien emperor. Jon Wurster voices the demon Bryce, and Tom Scharpling voices Jermaine in the episode of the same name. "Chips & Ice Cream" guest stars Ron Livingston, Riki Lindhome, and Kate Micucci; the latter two comprise the comedy band Garfunkel and Oates. Lindhome had previously appeared in the season five episode "The Party's Over, Isla de Señorita", playing the Island Lady, and Micucci had previously appeared in the season two episode "Heat Signature", playing Wendy, one of Marceline's ghost friends. Emo Philips reprises his role as Cuber in the episode "Graybles 1000+", and the episode also features musician Janet Klein as Tuber, the sister of Cuber. Kay Lenz voices Gunter's dream manifestation in "Hoots". Lena Dunham returns in "You Forgot Your Floaties", reprising her role as Betty, and Gillian Jacobs appears, voicing the role of M.A.R.G.L.E.S. Matt Gourley and Melissa Villaseñor guest star in "Orgalorg" as alien elders. The catalyst comet in "The Comet" was voiced by Tig Notaro.

Various minor and background characters are voiced by Tom Kenny, Dee Bradley Baker, Maria Bamford, Steve Little, and Kent Osborne.

Broadcast and reception

Broadcast

For the first five and a half seasons, the show aired on Monday nights. However starting with "Breezy", the show began to air on different days; following "Breezy", many episodes aired on Thursdays, although the season's seventeenth episode, "Ghost Fly", aired on a Tuesday night as a Halloween special. Following several months without new episodes, four installments—"Everything's Jake", "Is That You", "Jake the Brick", and "Dentist"—aired back-to-back on November 24, 25, 26, and 28, respectively. Likewise, the final six episodes of the season aired during the week of June 1, with the two-part season finale airing on June 5.

In addition, several episodes aired internationally prior to their domestic debut: "Evergreen" was broadcast on November 10 by Cartoon Network in Brazil, "Astral Plane" was uploaded onto Cartoon Network's Brazilian website on December 24, 2014, "The Visitor" first aired on February 3, 2015 on Cartoon Network in South Korea, and both "Friends Forever" and "Jermaine" aired on Cartoon Network in Latin America on April 6, 2015 and April 13, 2015 respectively.

Ratings
The season debuted on April 21, 2014, with the two-part episode "Wake Up"/"Escape from the Citadel". Together, both episodes were viewed by 3.321 million viewers and scored a 0.7 Nielsen rating in the 18- to 49-year-old demographic. Nielsen ratings are audience measurement systems that determine the audience size and composition of television programming in the United States, which means that the episodes were seen by 0.7 percent of all households aged 18 to 49 years old were watching television at the time of the episode's airing. This marked a slight decrease in viewers when compared to the previous season premiere "Finn the Human"/"Jake the Dog", which was seen by 3.44 million viewers, but it marked a massive increase of almost one million viewers when compared with the previous season finale, "Billy's Bucket List". The premiere was also the most-watched Cartoon Network telecast at the time of its airing among children aged 2–11 and 9–14, as well as with boys 2–11 and 9–14. It also marked a 153 percent increase in overall demographic ratings when compared to the same time the previous year. The season hit its nadir with the seventeenth episode, "Ghost Fly", which was seen by only 1.3 million viewers and scored a 0.2 percent adult 18–49 Nielsen rating, meaning that it was seen by only 0.2 percent of all 18- to 49-year-olds watching television at the time of the episode's airing. The season concluded with the two-part episode "Hot Diggity Doom"/"The Comet", which, together, were seen by 1.55 million viewers. The episodes scored 0.4 percent adult 18–49 Nielsen rating.

Reviews and accolades
The season received largely positive critical reviews. Eric Kohn of IndieWire applauded the two-part season opener, "Wake Up" and "Escape from the Citadel", for taking a darker turn in regards to the series' storytelling. Furthermore, he noted that the storyline concerning "Finn's cursed sword arm—an ingredient that has festered in the sidelines for weeks—reaches a beguiling new state." Likewise, Oliver Sava of The A.V. Club complimented the episodes for being full of harsh realizations concerning Finn's father and the vulnerability of his body; he ultimately concluded that "the developments of these two episodes dramatically alter the series' status quo to give this season an added boost of momentum from the very beginning." Each episode was also graded by The A.V. Club with a different letter grade; the season received two C's, twenty-two B's, and seventeen A's.

The A.V. Club named the series the 27th best television series of 2014, noting that, "The ongoing sixth season has ventured into even more dangerous emotional territory: parenthood. Coupled with deep dives into the history of Ooo and the increasing visual confidence of episodes like the surreal, breathtaking 'Food Chain,' Adventure Time appears ready to use its considerable heft and years of laying narrative foundations to do some of TV's finest storytelling about grappling with the past and accepting the responsibilities of adulthood." The site selected "Food Chain" and "Breezy" as stand-out episodes from 2014, and it later named the season finale "The Comet" one of the best TV episodes of 2015.

Masaaki Yuasa and Eunyoung Choi were both nominated for an "Outstanding Achievement, Directing in an Animated TV/Broadcast Production" Annie Award for their work on "Food Chain". "Food Chain" was later selected for competition at the 2015 Annecy International Animated Film Festival, On April 23, 2015, it was announced that the series had won a Peabody Award for Best Children's Programming. At the 67th Primetime Emmy Awards in 2015, the episode "Jake the Brick" won a Primetime Emmy Award for Short-format Animation, and Tom Herpich won an Outstanding Individual Achievement in Animation Emmy for his work on "Walnuts & Rain". At the 2016 Annie Awards, the writing staff for "The Diary" was nominated for an Outstanding Achievement, Writing in an Animated TV/Broadcast Production award, and Herpich was nominated for an Outstanding Achievement, Storyboarding in an Animated TV/Broadcast Production award.

Episodes

Home media
Warner Home Video released several DVD compilations that contained episodes from the sixth season. The first of these, entitled "Princess Day", was released on July 29, 2014. The release was notable because it marked the first time that an episode—in this case, the eponymous "Princess Day"—had been released on DVD before it had officially aired on Cartoon Network. Several other DVD compilations, including Finn the Human, Frost & Fire, The Enchiridion, and Card Wars were also released that contained episodes from the sixth season. All DVD releases can be purchased on the Cartoon Network Shop, and the individual episodes can be downloaded from both the iTunes Store and Amazon.com.

Full season release
The full season set was released on DVD and Blu-ray on October 11, 2016.

Notes

References

2014 American television seasons
2015 American television seasons
Adventure Time seasons